The Marty Party Hit Pack is a compilation album by American country music singer Marty Stuart. It was released in 1995 via MCA Nashville.

Content
The album includes several cuts from Stuart's 1991 album Tempted and 1992 album This One's Gonna Hurt You, plus his 1991 duet with Travis Tritt, "The Whiskey Ain't Workin'", previously on Tritt's 1991 album It's All About to Change. Two tracks on the album previously appeared on multi-artist tribute albums: the rendition of The Band's "The Weight" previously appeared on the 1994 album Rhythm, Country and Blues and the rendition of "Don't Be Cruel" previously appeared on the 1994 album It's Now or Never: The Tribute to Elvis. "The Likes of Me" and "If I Ain't Got You" are new to the compilation. Both were released as singles, but failed to make Top 40 on the Hot Country Songs chart. The latter was originally recorded by Conway Twitty on his 1993 album Final Touches, which, like Stuart's version, was produced by Don Cook.

Reception

Jana Pendragon of Allmusic rated the album 4.5 out of 5 stars, saying that "This is a hits package that shows off Marty Stuart's hard-earned success with tongue firmly planted in cheek." Jay Orr of New Country rated the compilation 3 out of 5 stars. His review criticized the album as "more like a marketing concept than a career move" due to only six of the songs coming from Stuart's own albums. He praised "If I Ain't Got You" as "a twangy rock 'n' roller" but criticized "The Likes of Me" as "generic radio fodder". Orr also criticized Stuart's vocal performance on the covers of "The Weight" and "Don't Be Cruel", but overall cited the album as a "neat summation of Stuart's work".

The album was certified gold by the Recording Industry Association of America (RIAA) on August 10, 1998 for U.S. shipments of 500,000 copies.

Track listing

Personnel on new tracks
Compiled from the liner notes.
Dennis Burnside – Hammond organ
Mark Casstevens – acoustic guitar
Paul Franklin – pedal steel guitar
Rob Hajacos – fiddle
John Barlow Jarvis – piano
Larry Marrs – background vocals
Brent Mason – electric guitar
Michael Rhodes – bass guitar
John Wesley Ryles – background vocals
Marty Stuart – lead vocals, electric guitar, acoustic guitar
Lonnie Wilson – drums, percussion

References

1995 compilation albums
Marty Stuart albums
MCA Records compilation albums